Year 128 (CXXVIII) was a leap year starting on Wednesday (link will display the full calendar) of the Julian calendar. At the time, it was known as the Year of the Consulship of Calpurnius and Libo (or, less frequently, year 881 Ab urbe condita). The denomination 128 for this year has been used since the early medieval period, when the Anno Domini calendar era became the prevalent method in Europe for naming years.

Events 
 By place 
 Roman Empire 
 Emperor Hadrian visits the Roman province of North Africa, in order to inspect Legio III Augusta stationed at Lambaesis. For strategic reasons, the legionnaires are located in the Aurès Mountains.
 Hadrian's Wall is completed in Britain. Built mostly of stone in the east and with a wooden  palisade in the west. They construct at least 16 forts, with about 15,000 legionaries digging ditches, quarrying rock and cutting stone, preventing idleness which led to unrest and rebellions in the ranks.
 Roman agriculture declines, as imports from Egypt and North Africa depress wheat prices, making it unprofitable to farm, and forcing many farmers off the land.
 Roman bakeries produce dozens of bread varieties, and the Romans distribute free bread for the poor.
 Hadrian begins his inspection of the provinces of Greece, Asia Minor and Egypt.

 Asia 
 King Gaeru of Baekje succeeds to the throne of Baekje in the Korean peninsula (until 166).

 By topic 
 Arts and sciences 
 The fossils of large prehistoric animals are discovered in Dalmatia.
 The Pantheon in Rome is finished.

Births 
Xun Shuang, Chinese politician and writer (d. 190)

Deaths 
 Giru of Baekje, Korean ruler

References